Hilma Nikolaisen (born 1 July 1982, in Moi) is a Norwegian musician living in Oslo. Nikolaisen is the sister of Emil, Ivar and Elvira Nikolaisen. She is currently focused on her solo project under her own name. Her debut album as a solo artist, Puzzler, was released in 2016, and got her nominated for the norwegian music award Spellemannprisen 2016 in the indie category.

She played bass guitar in the band Serena Maneesh and was vocalist in the trio Umbrella. She was also previously a member of the band Loch Ness Mouse.

In 2016, Hilma Nikolaisen was voted best dressed famous Norwegian female in the magazine Elle.

She has a son with former Mayhem vocalist Sven Erik Kristiansen.

Discography

Studio albums 

 Puzzler (2016)
 Mjusic (2018)
 Heritage (2021)

Concert albums 

 Limbo Jives (2020)

References

1982 births
Living people
People from Lund, Norway
Norwegian rock bass guitarists
21st-century Norwegian singers
21st-century Norwegian women singers
21st-century Norwegian bass guitarists